Åke Lindblom (27 January 1919 – 21 May 1992) was a Swedish sports shooter. He competed in the 50 metre pistol event at the 1956 Summer Olympics.

References

External links
 

1919 births
1992 deaths
Swedish male sport shooters
Olympic shooters of Sweden
Shooters at the 1956 Summer Olympics
Sportspeople from Skåne County
20th-century Swedish people